The Lahore riots of 1953 were a series of violent riots against the Ahmadiyya Movement, a faith marginalized in Pakistan, mainly in the city of Lahore, Pakistan as well as the rest of Punjab, which were eventually quelled by the Pakistan Army who declared three months of martial law. The demonstrations began in February 1953, soon escalating into citywide incidents, including looting, arson and the murder of somewhere between 200 to 2000 people, while thousands more were left displaced. According to the official inquiry conducted by the Punjab Government the actual number killed in these riots were around 20 people. The page one of the inquiry says "Before the declaration of Martial Law, the police had to resort to firing in several places and at least two persons were killed on the night of 4th March and ten on 5th March, Sixty-six persons more must have been injured in the firing because that number of wounded persons admitted to the Lahore hospitals had gunshot wounds. The number of casualties admitted by the military to have been caused in quelling the disturbances in Lahore was eleven killed and forty-nine wounded. In some other towns also there were a number of casualties caused by firing by the police or the military.". Official Unable to contain the increasingly widespread civil disorder, Governor-General Ghulam Muhammad handed over the administration of the city to the army under Lieutenant General Azam Khan, imposing martial law on 6 March.

One of the major controversial differences between Ahmadis and mainstream Sunni and Shia Muslims is their different interpretations of Khatam an-Nabiyyin. Mainstream Sunni and Shia Muslims are awaiting the coming of the Mahdi and the Second Coming of Jesus and reject the claims of Mirza Ghulam Ahmad whom Ahmadis believe to be the Promised Messiah and Mahdi. The Ahmadiyya Community was a vocal proponent of the Pakistan Movement and were actively engaged with the Muslim league having strong relations with many prominent Muslim Leaguers and were opposed to the Congress backed Majlis-e-Ahrar-ul-Islam. After the independence of Pakistan in 1947, Ahmadis prospered and reached many high ranking Government and Military positions in Pakistan, due to an extremely high Literacy rate. They held up stay as an important political force in Pakistan, due to its support for secularism and acted as a counterbalance to Majlis-e-Ahrar-ul-Islam.  This group was disillusioned and disorganized after 1947 and politically isolated. Even before partition one of its primary targets was the Ahmadiyya movement. However, in 1949, the Majlis-e-Ahrar launched countrywide campaigns and protests resulting in a ban on Majlis-e-Ahrar in 1954.

Demands and culmination

Disturbances began after an ultimatum was delivered to the Prime Minister of Pakistan on 21 January 1953 by a deputation of ulama representing Majlis-i Amal (council of action) constituted by an All-Pakistan Muslim Parties Convention held in Karachi from 16 to 18 January 1953. 
(Including Tehreek-e-Khatme Nabuwwat — under Majlis-e-Ahrar-ul-Islam) The ultimatum stated unless three demands were met:

Removal of Zafarullah Khan from the foreign ministry;
Removal of Ahmadis from top government offices;
Declaration of Ahmadis as non-Muslims.

... Majlis-e-Amal would resort to direct action (rast iqdum).

Disturbances and aftermath
The ultimatum was rejected and disturbances commenced.

On 6 March martial law was declared. Two people were killed by police prior to martial law and casualties "admitted by the military" caused in "quelling the disturbances in Lahore" were eleven killed and 49 wounded.

Marking the military's first foray into civilian politics, the 70-day-long military deployment saw Lahore return to normalcy under Azam Khan's coherent leadership ; the Secretary General of the Awami Muslim League, Maulana Abdul Sattar Khan Niazi, was arrested and sentenced to death, but his sentence was subsequently commuted. The riots also brought unprecedented political consequences; Ghulam Muhammad first dismissed Mian Mumtaz Daultana from the post of Chief Minister of Punjab on 24 March, allegedly for manipulating the religious element in anti-Ahmadi violence for political benefits.
Next on 17 April, using his special powers under the Government of India Act 1935, Ghulam Muhammad dismissed Prime Minister, Khwaja Nazimuddin and the entire federal cabinet. Muhammad Ali Bogra (Pakistan's ambassador to the United States) replaced him. Bogra, who did not know why he was being called back, took the oath as new Prime Minister within hours of Nazimuddin's dismissal.

On 19 June 1953 a Court Of Inquiry was established to look into disturbances, known as the Punjab Disturbances Court Of Inquiry. The inquiry commenced on 1 July and held 117 sittings. The evidence was concluded on 23 January 1954 and arguments in the case lasted to 28 February 1954. Conclusions were formulated and the report issued 10 April 1954.

Timeline
Jan - After the convention of the All Pakistan Muslim League at Dhaka, anti-Ahmadiyya elements threatened to take direct action after 22 February 1953, if their demands were not met.
1 Feb - Burial of an Ahmadi was resisted by anti-Ahmadiyya elements in Sargodha.
23 Feb - Anti-Ahmadiyya riots broke out in West Pakistan specially in Punjab Province.
27 Feb - Publication of Alfazal,  a publication of the Ahmadiyya community, published from Lahore, was banned by the Government for one year. The vacuum was filled by the publication of  Farooq. The first issue of Farooq was published on 4 March but after the second issue, it was forced to stop publication on 11 March.
5 Mar - Master Manzoor Ahmed, a teacher was killed in Baghbanpura, Lahore.
6 Mar - Ahmadiyya Noor Mosque, Rawalpindi was attacked and set on fire by a mob.
Press belonging to an Ahmadi was burnt.
Many shops and houses belonging to Ahmadis and the President of Jamaat Ahmadiyya, Rawalpindi were ransacked.
6 Mar - Countrywide riots including torture, murder attempts and arson started against the Ahmadiyya especially in Lahore.
6 Mar - Martial law was declared in Lahore
8 Mar - Havaldar Abdul Ghafoor and another Ahmadi perfumer were killed in Lahore.
12 Mar - Additional Magistrate Jhang prohibited the Supreme Head of the Ahmadiyya Community from commenting on anti-Ahmadiyya riots and the anti-Ahmadiyya movement.
1 Apr - Mirza Shareef Ahmad and Mirza Nasir Ahmad were arrested in Lahore during the riots. They were released on 28 May.
Superintendent of Police Jhang searched Qasre Khilafat and the central offices of Sadar Anjuman Ahmadiyya, Chenab Nagar.
Nazir Tableegh was arrested.
7 May - Martial law authorities passed the death sentence on Maulana Abdus Sattar Niazi.
11 May - Martial Law authorities passed the death sentence on Abul Ala Maududi for writing Qadyani Masla, and certain press *statements delivered in February and March. 
13 May - Maududi's and Niazi's death sentences were changed to life sentences.
14 May - Martial law was lifted.

References

Ahmadiyya in Pakistan
Military history of Pakistan
Military operations involving Pakistan
Persecution of Ahmadis in Pakistan
1953 in Pakistan
History of Lahore (1947–present)
1953 riots
Riots and civil disorder in Pakistan
Attacks on religious buildings and structures in Pakistan
Religiously motivated violence in Pakistan
20th century in Lahore
Massacres in Pakistan